PZL.12 (PZL-H) was a prototype of a Polish amphibious flying boat designed and built in 1931 by Zygmunt Puławski, a pioneering Polish designer. He was killed in a crash involving this design.

Design and development
The Polish designer Zygmunt Puławski of the PZL works designed PZL-H in 1930, as a small touring amphibious aircraft, for his own needs. The factory agreed to construct a single aircraft for Puławski. At the same time, the Polish Navy revealed interest in training and liaison seaplanes, and PZL-H was proposed to the Navy. In late 1930 the prototype was built in the PZL in Warsaw in a semi-amateur way. It finally was given a designation PZL.12.

The prototype was first flown in February 1931 in Warsaw by Puławski, in a land configuration (without auxiliary floats). The plane was not tested on water. During the sixth flight on 21 March 1931, right after take-off, the plane stalled due to strong wind and crashed in Warsaw, killing Puławski. The death of this talented designer of fighter aircraft was recognized as a heavy blow to the Polish Air Force capabilities. Further work upon PZL.12 ceased.

Design
Mixed construction high-wing cantilever monoplane flying boat. A fuselage of duralumin construction, metal-covered, square in cross-section, split into watertight compartments. A V-shaped bottom was single-stepped. Engine on struts above a fuselage, with a two-blade pusher propeller. Two-spar trapezoid wings with rounded ends, of wooden construction, plywood and canvas covered. A tail of wooden construction. Crew of two, sitting side by side in an open cockpit. Retractable landing gear: main gear  folding under wings, rear skid. There were planned auxiliary floats under wings. Fuel tank 100 L.

Specifications

See also

References

Further reading

</ref>

1930s Polish civil utility aircraft
PZL aircraft
Flying boats
Single-engined pusher aircraft
High-wing aircraft
Amphibious aircraft